Brother, Cry for Me is a 1970 adventure film starring Leslie Parrish, Larry Pennell and Richard Davalos.

Three estranged brothers receive a letter from their late father inviting them to collect a large inheritance in an Aztec pyramid. Realizing that they each have a chance at their father's fortune, the brothers become murderously competitive.

References

1970 films
1970s adventure films
American independent films
Troma Entertainment films
1970s crime films
1970s English-language films
1970s American films